Zenith Irfan is the first Pakistani female motorcyclist to ride across Pakistan. Her father dreamt of traveling around the world on his motorbike, but when he died young at age 34, Zenith decided to fulfill his dream. "I did this for my father and I still do it for him. For me, going and riding across Pakistan is a spiritual endeavour," Irfan says.

Career 
In 2013, Sultan, Zenith's younger brother, bought a motorcycle, and Zenith started taking motorcycle lessons from him, practicing in their hometown. "I would just ride in the city and only knew the basics of riding," she says.

In August 2015, Zenith Irfan rode for 3,200 kilometers from Lahore through North Pakistan up to the Khunjerab Pass which borders China. 

She is thought to be the first female motorcyclist to travel across Pakistan. She has taken two trips since then, riding into Khyber Pakhtunkhwa and Gilgit Baltistan, completing 20,000 kilometers on her motorcycle.

She now keeps a photoblog by the name of “Zenith Irfan”, on Facebook to document her journeys.

Popular Culture 

Adnan Sarwar has made a biopic about her journey called Motorcycle Girl, which was released on 20 April 2018. Sohai Ali Abro portrays Irfan and the cast also includes Samina Peerzada and Ali Kazmi. Irfan commented that it should not be considered as just a film but rather a "dream my father saw and how he hoped to ride across the world on a motorcycle".

References

Year of birth missing (living people)
Living people
Pakistani sportswomen
Women motorcyclists
Long-distance motorcycle riders